, real name , is a fictional character from the Neon Genesis Evangelion franchise created by Gainax. In the series of the same name, he is the pilot of a giant mecha named Evangelion Unit 02 for the special agency Nerv. Kaworu is the seventeenth and final member of a series of enemies which threaten humanity named Angels. When he arrives at Nerv, he meets Eva-01 pilot Shinji Ikari, showing great affection towards him. After revealing his nature as an Angel, he asks Shinji to kill him to allow humanity to survive. Kaworu appears in the franchise's animated feature films and related media, video games, the original net animation Petit Eva: Evangelion@School, the Rebuild of Evangelion films, and the manga adaptation by Yoshiyuki Sadamoto. He also has a prominent role in Evangelion: 3.0 You Can (Not) Redo, the third film of the Rebuild saga.

The character, originally conceived by Gainax as a cat controlling a boy, was supposed to appear in the series' twenty-second episode. After several changes, director Hideaki Anno and screenwriter Akio Satsukawa portrayed him as the last Angel and he was included in the twenty-fourth episode.

Although Kaworu only appeared in one episode, the character was popular with audiences and animation enthusiasts and topped popularity polls. Some critics disliked his ambiguity, his lack of clarity, and the undertones of his relationship with Shinji; others praised his personality, finding him open, affectionate and sociable. His role in the film Evangelion 3.0 also attracted the attention of critics, with reviewers generally appreciating his relationship with Shinji.  Merchandise, particularly action figures, based on Kaworu have been released.

Conception 

Akio Satsukawa, a screenwriter who contributed to the writing of the series' twenty-fourth episode, "The Beginning and the End, or 'Knockin' on Heaven's Door, chose Kaworu's name. Satsukawa opted for the surname Nagisa (Japanese for "shore"), an homage to Japanese director Nagisa Ōshima. The name Kaworu was not written with the contemporary spelling  with the katakana , but with the archaic character . The kanji  was chosen for his graphic connection with the katakana  and the kanji , a detail referring to the Japanese title of the episode: .

Two years before the series was broadcast, Gainax published a presentation about the series entitled . In the twenty-second episode of the original project, a "bishōnen constantly accompanied by a cat" should have appeared. Nerv would have allowed the boy to enter its laboratories and, after a clash in which his fellow pilot Shinji Ikari found himself "in the dilemma of having to fight against an anthropomorphic enemy", "the greatest secret of the organization" would be revealed.

In the first drafts, the Angel would have been the cat, and the boy his puppet; the initial project was abandoned, and elements of it were merged into Kaworu. In preliminary proposals, he had an organ characteristic of Angels named core and the ability to modify his appearance through metamorphosis, ideas which were set aside during series' production. Anno conceived of him as an "ideal male"; according to him: "The plan was that the 'unconscious Shinji' would be Ayanami Rei, the Shinji who appears on the surface would be Ikari Shinji, and the 'ideal Shinji' would be Nagisa Kaworu". Character designer Yoshiyuki Sadamoto conceived him as "more elegant and more refined" than Shinji. Compared to him he should have been "taller, thinner and with a smaller face". For the somatic features of his face, he decided to blend those of Rei, Shinji himself, and Asuka Langley Soryu. Following a personal request from the director, colorist Harumi Takaboshi dyed his eyes red to draw an analogy with Rei's and give him "a distinct impression". In one of the drafts of the twenty-fourth episode he is also described as a blond-haired boy. Although he was conceived to appear only in the final episodes, during the making of the opening theme the main staff decided to depict him with a sketch by Sadamoto; in the editing phase, the sketch was inserted just before a frame depicting Rei Ayanami and the caption "Angels". While designing him, Sadamoto envisioned a "younger" voice than the final version.

In the early stages of production, scriptwriter Akio Satsukawa wrote some drafts of the script for the twenty-fourth episode in which Kaworu's relationship with Shinji would have been expanded and presented with less ambiguity. Some of his ideas included Kaworu and Shinji swimming naked in a river at night, Kaworu proposing to Shinji to play piano and cello together and a kiss scene between them. Anno originally gave him an outline that Satsukawa greatly expanded, something that struck Sadamoto. Though Anno did not attempt to dissuade Satsukawa and the homoerotic tone of his draft, at one point he considered it "above my tolerance level". The Evangelion staff and producers also rejected these proposals. Episode director and animator Masayuki refused to work on them and threatened to resign. The drafts then underwent several modifications before being accepted as the definitive script. However, they did not change or alter the essence of Nagisa's character; Anno said the draft's "atmosphere" was preserved in the script. Anno explained he wanted to hold on to the idea of an Angel "conversing in human language", mentioning it as a progression from Shinji's conversation with the Angel Leliel in the sixteenth episode. He also considered expanding Kaworu's role in the expanded director's cut version of the episode but decided to prioritize clarifying Kaworu's connection to Seele.

Staff indicated they had not been expecting Kaworu to provoke a strong sexual impression, or for him to become very popular in the first place. They attributed their lack of attention to this to the short time they had when they produced the later episodes, and mentioned Kaworu was not supposed to hold Shinji's hand in the bath scene. This was an animation error; he was supposed to touch it instead. Like other characters in the series, Anno conceived Kaworu based on his personality. He described Rei and Kaworu as part of his unconscious, and Kaworu specifically as his shadow—the dark and unconscious side of the psyche. According to some fans, he may have also used Kunihiko Ikuhara, the director of the animated series Sailor Moon and a friend of his, as a model. In an interview, Ikuhara denied the rumors, comparing Kaworu's cynical personality to Anno himself, while stating he was not in the least involved in the creation of the character. He also said he had close correspondence with Anno, with whom he was on good terms from the early design stages of Neon Genesis Evangelion. During the production of Sailor Moon, the entire staff went on a trip to the spa, and Ikuhara chatted all night with his colleague Anno, who worked as an animator for some of the series' episodes. Ikuhara himself, watching the episode, noticed how the situation with the bath was the same as the conversation he had with Anno.

Voice 

Akira Ishida voices Kaworu Nagisa in every appearance in the original series, as well as the later films, spin-offs, video games, and the Rebuild of Evangelion saga. In 1997, when The End of Evangelion was released, Ishida said he found the role "very difficult", and felt "a lot of pressure" during the dubbing of the film version. His emotional tension grew exponentially when he learned that there would be two feature movies, but he was satisfied with his performance. During the recording of Evangelion: 1.0 You Are (Not) Alone (2007), the first chapter of the Rebuild of Evangelion cinematic tetralogy, Anno explained in detail the role played by Kaworu in the new theatrical version and his relationship with Shinji. Even during the dubbing sessions for Evangelion: 3.0 You Can (Not) Redo (2012) he felt tense, but, supported and instructed step-by-step by the director, he overcame his performance anxiety and reprised the role. For the final installment, Evangelion: 3.0+1.0 Thrice Upon a Time, Ishida noted he had trouble saying the character's "complex" lines.

In English, Kyle Sturdivant voices him in the original series; he's also dubbed by Greg Ayres in the director's cut version, by Aaron Krohn in the two 1997 films, by Clifford Chapin in the Netflix' dub, by Jerry Jewell in the first dub of Rebuild of Evangelion and Daman Mills in the Amazon Prime Video's dub. 

In the Netflix dub, one of Kaworu's lines to Shinji was changed from ADV DVD's "I love you" to "I like you". This generated controversy among some fans, who felt it altered their relationship and contributed to queer erasure. Dan Kanemitsu, studio Khara's in-house translator responsible for the updated Evangelion subtitles, production assistance, and other official Gainax and Khara translations including the Rebuild of Evangelion films, explained in an interview that he consults the original creator when the meaning is unclear or ambiguous. He defended the importance of ambiguity, citing Anno's commentaries on Evangelions ambiguity and open-endedness, his commitment to accuracy, and getting the intended nuances of the text across a cultural gap. Shinji's voice actress, Megumi Ogata, also agreed with the translation for the Netflix/Khara release, saying she originally interpreted Kaworu's lines as "like", and that she is glad that the new version is closer to the Japanese original.

Appearances

Neon Genesis Evangelion 
Kaworu appears in the twenty-fourth episode of Neon Genesis Evangelion. A secret sect called Seele and a group called Commission for the Instrumentality of Mankind sent him to the headquarters of the special agency Nerv to carry out a mission as Fifth Child and the replacement for Asuka Langley Soryu, who became unable to pilot Unit 02. Soon after arriving in Tokyo-3 city, Kaworu has a premeditated meeting with Shinji Ikari, Third Child and Eva-01 pilot. He becomes friends with him, showing unconditional and sincere sympathy towards him. His position as a pilot allows him to enter Nerv without impediment, but he arouses the suspicions of Misato Katsuragi, a major in the organization's operations department. He is subjected to a synchronicity test with Unit 02, obtaining a result so high it astounds the organization's entire staff, since he can arbitrarily vary his rate of synchronization with the mecha. All data about his past is erased to conceal his true identity. Misato discovers that he was born on September 13, 2000, the day in which an enormous calamity called the Second Impact occurred at the South Pole, caused by the first of a series of enemies called Angels. He is revealed to be the seventeenth Angel and "last sacrificial messenger", named Tabris. The soul of the first Angel, Adam, is implanted in him. Seele, who captured Tabris when he was still in an embryonic state, "recovered" it. Unlike the other Angels, he can develop feelings close to those of humans and communicate with them. Once in the headquarters, he comes into contact with Rei Ayanami, pilot of the Eva-00, in which the soul of another Angel is implanted, and confesses to sharing his nature as a hybrid.

Using his Angel abilities, Kaworu manages to manipulate and control the movements of Unit 02, in an attempt to enter the Terminal Dogma of the Nerv headquarters and get in touch with the angel Adam, supposedly guarded within the structure. Despite his anthropomorphic features, the young man proves to possess a series of anomalous abilities, including levitation and an AT Field, a powerful force field characteristic of Angels and Evangelions. Arriving at his destination, he discovers that Adam is not kept inside the base, but the second Angel Lilith is. At the sight of Lilith, Kaworu interrupts his attempt at contact and decides to preserve the Lilim's lineage, the humankind that descends from her, rather than causing their extinction, allowing himself to be killed by Eva-01 and Shinji.

In the ending film of the series, Neon Genesis Evangelion: The End of Evangelion (1997), the souls of all humanity unite into one collective consciousness, and during a process called Human Instrumentality, Shinji argues symbolically with Kaworu and Rei Ayanami. Akira Ishida said the Kaworu who appears in The End of Evangelion is not real, nor is he concretely present; during the feature film he and Rei say they represent the "hope that people will one day be able to understand each other". He also appears during the death of the Nerv commander, Gendo Ikari, along with Rei and Shinji's mother Yui Ikari.

Rebuild of Evangelion 
In the Rebuild of Evangelion saga, Kaworu has a prominent role and he is aware of details of Shinji's life even before he can physically meet him. He is introduced in the final sequence of the first film, Evangelion: 1.0 You Are (Not) Alone (2007), in which he awakens on the surface of the Moon to converse with a Seele member. During the scene, he rises from a coffin placed on a lunar sea; next to him there are four other coffins already open and four still closed, for a total of nine visible coffins. Behind him, for a moment, a white giant is framed, similar to the Angel Lilith. He is completely naked, with no need for a suit or other means to breathe on the Moon. He addresses commander Gendo Ikari, who is visiting a place named Tabgha Base, as "father". In Evangelion: 2.0 You Can (Not) Advance (2009), the second installment of the saga, when Shinji tries to save Rei and unwittingly starts the Third Impact cataclysm, he descends aboard an Evangelion unit known as Mark.06. He stops the Third Impact, addressing Shinji with the phrase: "At least this time I will be able to make you happy." Originally, Kaworu would have said the line with the light-hearted smile of the original series; in the production phase, however, it was decided to give him an unusually troubled expression. Kazuya Tsurumaki, the assistant director of the classic series and related movies, described him as a man who takes his wife back by force. He also said: "[We thought it would be] more interesting if Kaworu looked like [he was thinking]: 'You've been with a woman while I've been away? How dare you...!'". Staff initially wanted to give him a "showier entrance", and originally give him a scene talking to Asuka when Eva 03 is possessed the ninth Angel.

In the third movie, Evangelion: 3.0 You Can (Not) Redo (2012), set fourteen years after the previous feature film, he works for Nerv and is designated to pilot the Eva-13 together with Shinji on behalf of Gendo, who he calls "king of Lilim". He shows Shinji, alone and scared of the new world, the consequences of his actions on planet Earth. Shinji is initially reluctant, but Kaworu offers him an opportunity to revert the damage done by Third Impact. To train, the two boys practice piano on the same a quatre mains musical base. Having reached a good harmony, the two head aboard Eva-13 to the Terminal Dogma of the Nerv base. Asuka and Mari Makinami confront them. However, Kaworu falls for a trap set by Gendo, and causes Shinji to start the Fourth Impact accidentally. Nagisa reveals he is the first Angel, but demoted to thirteenth, and dies telling Shinji: "We will meet again." Akira Ishida, Kaworu's voice actor, was asked if the sequence of the two boys united in the same Evangelion could be interpreted as a "love scene"; Ishida replied he "could not make that interpretation", and left it up to what the director said or what fans would speculate, saying: "But, at the very least, them getting in the same unit is different, as they both pursue the same goal together. It seems representative of the depth of their connection.".

Manga 
In the Neon Genesis Evangelion manga, written by the series' character designer Yoshiyuki Sadamoto, Kaworu is introduced in advance in a narrative arc roughly corresponding to the nineteenth episode of the series. In the 57th chapter of the comic, he meets Shinji in the ruins of a church during a piano solo. In his first appearance, he kills a stray cat in front of Shinji, arguing this would spare the cat further pain. He is later brought into Nerv to replace the Fourth Child, Toji Suzuhara, who died in a fight, fighting alongside Rei Ayanami against the Angel Armisael. His role as an Angel also changes, being presented as the twelfth instead of the seventeenth. In this version of events, Shinji has strong suspicions of the Fifth Child, and he accuses Kaworu of violating his personal space. Following Rei's death, Shinji temporarily moves to his apartment, afflicted and heartbroken by the loss he has just suffered. Shinji has a nightmare and starts to hyperventilate. Kaworu uses this opportunity to perform cardiopulmonary resuscitation by kissing Shinji, arousing his anger. Over time, their relationship becomes increasingly cold and tormented, until they take two different paths.

Unlike the original animated series, in which ambiguity remains about the relationship between Shinji and Kaworu, leaving great freedom of interpretation for the viewers, for the manga Sadamoto changed Kaworu's characterization, leaving less margin for interpretation. According to him, in the comic, Kaworu feels "a reflection of Rei's feelings" for Shinji, but he fails to understand them. Irritated by his behavior, after killing Kaworu, Shinji admits he felt "drawn to him", but in the end rejects him, "because he is not Rei". Before his death, the Third Child imagines himself strangling Kaworu at the same time and place he met him. For this scene, the author took inspiration from the film Betty Blue, the tormented story of two young lovers, by Jean-Jacques Beineix, in which he strangles her in the end for love. Sadamoto created Kaworu to represent "a situation in which Shinji has to confront liking someone"; according to him, Nagisa, most of all, is the person who understands the boy. In an interview Sadamoto compared his death to a "contradictory fumi-e", an ancient Japanese ritual consisting of the trampling of Christian icons, in which Tabris would ask Shinji to prove he liked him by killing him. According to Sadamoto, in this particular moment of his life Shinji "does not want the affection of a girl, but the approval of another boy". Unlike Hideaki Anno, who wanted to give Kaworu the image of an "ideal man", Sadamoto, who believes that human beings are the last evolutionary stage of Angels, tried to represent him as a "pre-human", innocent and naive character. The artist was inspired by his experience, particularly by a classmate in elementary school, a charming transfer student from Tokyo for whom he felt great admiration. "I secretly thought it was very cool. It was not romance ... It is a delicate feeling in a delicate age".

In other media 
After the conclusion of Neon Genesis Evangelions first airing, a self-parody audio track written by Anno called After the End was released. On it the series' characters, played by their original voice actors, jokingly discuss and prepare a new ending just before the production schedule deadline, breaking the fourth wall. Kaworu appears; when Asuka calls him "homoboy", he tells her, "I wish you wouldn't make statements when you lack evidence for them." Nagisa, along with Eva's other pilots, joins a super sentai-style superhero group named Shin sentai Evangelion. In the movie Neon Genesis Evangelion: Death and Rebirth (1997) there are sequences in which four children from the third middle school of the city of Tokyo-2, with their respective instruments, practice a string quartet in the school's auditorium. Among them is a violinist who looks like Kaworu; according to what is indicated by the superimposed writings, however, the event would take place eighteen months before his appearance in Tokyo-3. From the script, it is clear that, despite the similarity with the protagonists of the series, the four children should still be interpreted as actors in an imaginary sequence.

The character appears in video games dedicated to Neon Genesis Evangelion and is available as a romantic option in Neon Genesis Evangelion: Girlfriend of Steel 2nd, Neon Genesis Evangelion 2,  and Neon Genesis Evangelion: Shinji Ikari Raising Project. He's also present in Raising Project manga adaptation as an agent sent by Seele at Ritsuko's behest. In the manga Neon Genesis Evangelion: Angelic Days he knows Shinji's father, Gendo, years before the main events without having changed his appearance. In the chibi parody series Petit Eva: Evangelion@School Kaworu is president of the school student council particularly popular among the students at his school who tends to protect Shinji, whom he loves. In the manga Evangelion - Detective Shinji Ikari, written by Takumi Yoshimura, Ryōji Kaji and Kaworu are portrayed as two private investigators to whom Shinji is forced to turn. In Neon Genesis Evangelion: Campus Apocalypse, his personality is relatively similar to that of the original series. At the beginning of the manga, Kaworu is seen by Shinji near a vending machine running away from the scene of an explosion with Rei Ayanami, with whom he has an unspecified bond. Like the original series, he immediately shows great interest in Shinji, making him uncomfortable. He is also present in Neon Genesis Evangelion: Legend of the Piko Piko Middle School Students. Kaworu is one of the main characters of a pachinko entitled , released in Japan in April 2009. During the game, Nagisa intervenes during Operation Yashima against Ramiel with his Eva-04.

In addition to video games based on the original animated series, Kaworu has also appeared in media not related to the Evangelion franchise, such as Million Arthur, Hortensia Saga, Keri hime sweets, Summons Board, Divine Gate, Monster Strike, Final Gear, Puzzle & Dragons, and Puyopuyo!! Quest. Kaworu briefly assists Shinji in Neon Genesis Evangelion: Anima, which also features a "Dark Kaworu" who hates humans and music; he is also present in the crossover franchise Super Robot Wars.

Characterization and themes 

Kaworu is an erudite boy with an easy-going, straightforward and honest personality, particularly with Shinji Ikari. Right from the start, he shows great interest in the Third Child, the first person with whom he comes into contact after arriving in Tokyo-3. Shinji is feeling great isolation and need after the death, departure, or alienation of all his peers. However, his esoteric way of communicating confounds Shinji. Kaworu also shows great interest in humanity. He describes the music, particularly the "Ode to Joy", as the highest achievement of human culture and reflects on the fragility and nature of humans. He is very direct in his interactions and  seemingly has no interest in, or knowledge of, social conventions. He shows sympathy for Rei, who shares his hybrid nature. Kaworu seeks active contact with Shinji as a friend. Talking with Shinji, Kaworu says he thinks was "born to meet him". Although Shinji is inclined to maintain a certain emotional distance from other people, the Fifth Child can make him express his feelings openly. Kaworu shows he feels spontaneous sympathy and affection towards Shinji, irrespective of his goal as the seventeenth Angel. After they meet, Shinji accepts the friendly and unreserved nature of his actions and lets him approach. The Fifth Child captivates Shinji with his charm. Despite the short time spent together, Kaworu and Shinji became interested in each other and build a relationship based on mutual appreciation. He is the first person to tell Shinji he likes him and the first person that Shinji opens his heart to. When Kaworu takes over Eva-02, Shinji expresses disbelief in him not revealing his Angelic nature and says Kaworu has betrayed him, "just like my father". After his sudden death, the Third Child falls back into a state of profound affliction. Shortly before dying, Kaworu maintains his feelings of affection for his colleague, saying that meeting him made him happy. After his death, Misato fails to console Shinji.

Since the first airing of the series, controversies have arisen over the nature of Shinji and Kaworu's relationship, as has Kaworu's character's nature. Kaworu and Shinji's relationship is depicted in an ambiguously worded manner, as Kaworu uses the phrase  to express his feelings for Shinji; it can be used to denote anything from intimacy or friendship to love. He also states that Shinji deserves . In his book Anime Explosion!, writer Patrick Drazen expresses the view that Kaworu's offer of apparent love for Shinji is a tactic that he uses as the last Angel to disarm Shinji. Drazen reports that some believe that whether Kaworu as an Angel has any concept of sexuality is unclear because of the way he is presented in the series.

Lynzee Loveridge of Anime News Network interpreted Kaworu as a negative figure, saying that "Kaworu's kindness has a nefarious side", seeing him as an Angel who deceives and uses Shinji for his own purposes. For Mike Crandol he "is representative of blind, total and unconditional love and acceptance, but like those things Kaoru turns out to not be real at all". Their colleague Zac Bertschy has a mixed opinion in his review of Rebuild 3.0. While not interpreting him as an antagonist or a negative figure, according to Bertschy, his presence demonstrates Shinji's great emotional fragility and the difficulty of his long path to self-acceptance. He describes Kaworu as a loving, considerate partner who cares deeply for Shinji's happiness, refuses to leave him behind, and even takes Shinji's terrible burden as his own; he notes: "Shinji has misinterpreted Kaworu's love not as evidence that he himself is worth loving and thus his motivation can be entirely his own, but that Kaworu's love itself makes him worthwhile [...] But he's still just fooling himself. He's still making catastrophic decisions motivated by self-hatred – Kaworu's love doesn't make him a complete person."

Kentaro Takekuma, the editor of a book of interviews with Evangelion staff named Parano Evangelion, believes that for Shinji, Kaworu turns out to be the first friend he can trust and a homosexual romantic interest. Japanese scholar and writer Yūya Satō compared his role to that of the male characters of the yaoi, as well as that of the characters of the shōjo genre; for Sato, the appearance of Kaworu is more important on a thematic than narrative level, and would have the purpose of deepening the psychological aspects of Shinji. She compares his role to shōjo manga, where the process and the relational dynamics of the protagonists have more weight than the conclusion or the fights. Japanator writer Elliot Gay described Kaworu as a positive figure, as for Shinji he "represents hope; the hope that maybe he can redo things". For Kunihiko Ikuhara, director of Sailor Moon and a friend of Hideaki Anno: "Shinji is bullied by his father, slapped by Ayanami, called stupid by Asuka and Misato yells at him to behave like a man; he doesn't receive much compassion from others, and I believe that in this situation the only one to tell him that it's okay as it is, is Kaworu." Kotono Mitsuishi and Megumi Hayashibara, Japanese voice actresses of Misato Katsuragi and Rei Ayanami, compared the two to Orihime and Hikoboshi, two legendary lovers of the Japanese tanabata myth. Megumi Ogata, Shinji's voice actress, rejected the notion of Kaworu as his lover, or that he is someone he can depend on, but instead sees him as a friend that is his equal. She pointed out that Shinji is more clingy in the original series, while in the Rebuild saga he has a more active role and his relationship with Kaworu is consequently different: "I feel like, this time, it's more than his attraction to Kaworu or what he learns from him – they're depicted more as friends gradually closing the distance between each other."

In Apollonius of Tyana's Nuctemeron, Tabris is the Angel of free will and freedom. In Neon Genesis Evangelion, connecting to the Judeo-Christian tradition, Tabris chooses to be killed by Shinji, finding absolute freedom in death. Writer Aaron Ploof compared Kaworu to Jesus Christ for his compassionate character and his sacrifice. Conversely, Carl Horn, editor of the Evangelion manga in English, compared Kaworu to the character Satan in Mark Twain's novella The Mysterious Stranger, for acting with indifference to human morality, while French website Du9 likened the image of Kaworu killed by Eva-01 to Francisco Goya's Saturn Devouring His Son. Wired also  speculated that Kaworu is inspired by Satan, also known as Ryo Asuka, the main antagonist of Gō Nagai's Devilman. According to Yūichirō Oguro, who curated contents of the home video editions of Neon Genesis Evangelion, he presents affinities with Lalah Sune, a female character from the Mobile Suit Gundam franchise. For Oguro, their relationship with the story's male protagonist traces an analogy between the characters: both appear in the last episodes of the series and seem to be able to understand the feelings of the male main character, dying by his own hand.

Reviewer Toji Aida compared Kaworu to a ghost of the Noh theatre who disrupt the events of the story in the tripartite Jo-ha-kyū structure of the Rebuild series. Los Angeles Times's Inkoo Kang also saw in his dialogues with Shinji, in which he tells him that all sins can be expiated, a reference to Christianity. According to critic Mario Pasqualini, the Book of Life cited by Kaworu is a reference to a concept of the same name in Christianity, according to which it is a text in which God would have listed in his hand the people destined to go to Heaven on the Last Judgment. The reviewer also compared the Rebuild to the science fiction movie Summer Vacation 1999 (1988). The film introduces a character named Kaoru, a new student at a boys' boarding school who has a love affair with fellow student Kazuhiko. Kaoru turns out to be the reincarnation of Yū, a boy who died by suicide shortly before, who was resurrected to try to win Kazuhiko over, change the story, and give him a new ending.

Cultural impact

Popularity 
Despite his one-episode appearance, the character of Kaworu became popular among series' fans and he rivaled the female protagonists of Neon Genesis Evangelion Rei Ayanami and Asuka Langley Soryu. The character ranked high in popularity polls about the best anime male characters, the strongest anime pilots, most memorable anime deaths and best Angels in Evangelion. In 1997 and 1998, Kaworu took second and sixth place among the most popular male characters of the moment in two polls conducted by Animage magazine. He also appeared in the monthly surveys of the magazine, remaining in the top twenty in 1997 polls. In 1998 Animage ranked him twenty-third among the most popular anime characters of the moment, and 43rd in 1999.

In August and September 2009, after the release of Evangelion 2.0 movie, he emerged in sixth and third place among the most popular characters of Newtype magazine; in October he ranked fourth. In March of the following year, Newtype included him among the most popular male characters of the 1990s, giving him second place after Shinji. In February 2015, nearly twenty years after the series first aired, he emerged seventh on Newtype charts. He also ranked in Evangelion popularity polls, usually in the top three. In June 2021, after the 3.0+1.01 re-release of the final Rebuild film, he finished second most popular male character in another Newtype poll.

Critical reception 

Criticism of Kaworu's character and his relationship with Shinji in the original series has been positive. According to the website Otaquest, detractors have labeled him as a "yaoi fuel", "while others see him as a vital piece of the Evangelion puzzle". For Caleb Bailey of Comic Book Resources the hot spring scene "blazed the trail" on homosexual relationships in Japanese animation, being "ahead of its time". Anthony Gramuglia cited Shinji and Kaworu among the best queer representations in Japanese animation, but criticized Kaworu's degrading role in some spin-offs.

LGBT-oriented portal Pride.com praised Kaworu and his relationship with Shinji, "especially during a time where LGBTQ representation was almost nonexistent in many forms of media".  Lyznee Loveridge of Anime News Network praised its development, finding it "refreshing". Her colleague Kenneth Lee criticized Kaworu as "an enigmatic figure that further adds fuel to the fire of confusion, but he just manages to raise even more questions that remain unanswered". Lee considers their relationship to be "disturbing, gratuitous, and unnecessary". According to Lee, the openness Shinji shows towards Kaworu is implausible and "irrational": "Ultimately, the homosexuality issue seems nothing more than cheap shock value tactics to stun Generation X".

Screen Rant and Comic Book Resources listed him among the best characters in the series. The twenty-fourth episode is considered one of the best of the series, and his fight with Shinji was also received positively by critics. For Comic Book Resources' Reuben Baron, in particular, his defeat is "the most dramatic example" of the narrative seriousness of Neon Genesis Evangelion later episodes. Screen Rant's Jack Cameron feels his confrontation with Shinji is, "Perhaps the most heartbreaking of fights in the whole series". Kaworu's last scenes were also appreciated by anime critics. According to the Asiascape site, his last scene, in which he's trapped in the hands of Shinji's Eva-01 and marked by a long sixty-second freeze-frame, represents one of the more prominent uses of creative visual motifs in the series.

Carlo Santos of Anime News Network appreciated the character of Kaworu and the role he played in Sadamoto's manga; he wrote, "the tension between the two boys soon becomes one of the most intriguing subplots". Zac Bertschy, reviewing Evangelion 3.0, praised the development of their relationship, describing it as the film's highlight. Anime Reign magazine expressed a similar opinion, considering it one of the few merits of characterization in the movie. Nicoletta Christina Browne of THEM Anime Reviews found Kaworu's personality and relationship with Shinji in 3.0 effective, but wordy and rushed, while Los Angeles Times's Inkoo Kang considered Kaworu's interactions with Shinji melodramatic.

Legacy 
Kaworu Nagisa has been used for advertising campaigns and a wide range of merchandising items, including action figures, nendoroids, backpacks, perfumes, sweets, cosmetics, clothing, toys, key rings, watches and jewelry.

On 22 May 1997, Kadokawa Shoten published a book dedicated to him entitled . In August of the same year, Japanese yaoi magazine June published a volume entitled , dedicated to Shinji and Kaworu. The book, whose title is taken from the first verse of the show's theme song, contains two long interviews with Hideaki Anno, the discarded drafts for the twenty-fourth episode, and dojinshi by mangaka from the shonen ai scene, such as Reku Fuyanagi (Gundam Wing: Ground Zero) and Takamure Tamotsu (Umi ni nita sora no iro). In 2005, to celebrate the tenth anniversary of the series release, mangaka Mine Yoshizaki designed an action figure of a female version of Angel Tabris named Tabris-XX. As a promotion for its 10th Anniversary Special Edition of Evangelion, ADV Films published a humorous bumper sticker which reads "Kaworu died for your sins". Kaworu's popularity is also parodied in a spin-off manga entitled , released in fourteen volumes from 2006 to 2015, in which a parody of him works in a pachinko parkour and dates and obsessive Evangelion female fan named Sakura Mogami.

In 2008 Kadokawa published a fanbook entitled All About Nagisa Kaworu: A Child of the Evangelion, a collection of fan letters, poems, reprinted manga pages, erotic dōjinshi, and interviews with gravure idols. In 2015 Kadokawa published a third book dedicated to him, entitled , containing unpublished illustrations, information and interviews with staff. In the same year the 7-Eleven chain put on the market a  life-size statue of the character, auctioned and sold for over 1,728,000 Japanese yen. In 2017 the official Evangelion Store inaugurated a summer festival dedicated to Kaworu, offering unreleased merchandising. In 2018 it was used for features of the 500 Type Eva, a high-speed train dedicated to Evangelion. In 2019 Bandai announced a card game dedicated to Evangelion titled Evangelion Card Game; one of the two sets of the game, called Ev02, is dedicated to the characters of Kaworu and Asuka.

Tony Takezaki paid homage to him in his comic Tony Takezaki's Evangelion, in which he is parodied by Keroro, the protagonist of Keroro Gunso. References and homages to the character of Kaworu are present in Spider-Verse, in the dorama The Full-Time Wife Escapist, and Keroro Gunso, in which he is parodied by Saburō, another character played by Ishida. Japanese singer and voice actress Chiaki Kuriyama stated that she developed interest in dubbing after Kaworu and Rei Ayanami. Comic Book Resources's Kristen Lopez also compared Albedo from Genshin Impact to Kaworu, speculating that the latter character may have been an influence for the former.

References

Further reading 
 
 
 

Child characters in animated television series
Television characters introduced in 1996
Fictional angels
Fictional Japanese people in anime and manga
Male characters in anime and manga
Neon Genesis Evangelion characters
Teenage characters in television
Teenage characters in anime and manga
Science fiction film characters